Perry Hartnett is a former guard in the National Football League.

Biography
Hartnett was born on April 28, 1960 in Galveston, Texas.

Career
Hartnett was drafted in the fifth round of the 1982 NFL Draft by the Chicago Bears and spent two seasons with the team. After three seasons away from the NFL, he was a member of the Green Bay Packers during the 1987 NFL season.

He played at the collegiate level at Southern Methodist University.

See also
List of Green Bay Packers players

References

People from Galveston, Texas
Chicago Bears players
Green Bay Packers players
American football offensive guards
Southern Methodist University alumni
SMU Mustangs football players
Living people
1960 births